The  (Scottish Gaelic, literally "people of the arts", often translated as bards) served as advisers to nobles and chiefs of clans throughout the Scottish Gàidhealtachd until the late 17th century. Many of them specialised in preserving the genealogy of families and recited family trees at the succession of chieftains.

The  were held in high esteem throughout the Scottish Highlands. As late as the end of the 17th century, they sat in the sreath or circle among the nobles and chiefs of families. They took the preference of the ollamh or doctor in medicine. After the extinction of the druids, they were brought in to preserve the genealogy of families, and to repeat genealogical traditions at the succession of every chieftain. They had great influence over all the powerful men of the time. Their persons, their houses, their villages, were sacred. Whatever they asked was given them — not always, however, out of respect, but from fear of their satire, which frequently followed a denial of their requests. They lost by degrees, through their own insolence and importunity, all the respect their order had so long enjoyed, and consequently all their wonted profits and privileges. The Lord Lyon of Scotland may well have his roots in something parallel.

Martin Martin says of them:

Among the ancient Brythons there were, according to Jones, an order of bard called the Arwyddwardd, i.e. the ensign bard or herald at arms, who employed himself in genealogy, and in blazoning the arms of princes and nobles, as well as altering them according to their dignity or deserts.

Irish 
Aosdána is currently used in Ireland as the name of an exclusive organisation of artists and writers founded in the late 20th century.

See also
 Bard
 Seanchaí, Irish storyteller

References
  (Aois-dàna, Bard)

Scottish genealogy
Social history of Scotland
Scottish Gaelic language
Gaelic culture